Indian Springs Metropark is a park in the Huron-Clinton system of metro parks in the US state of Michigan.  The headwaters of the Huron River lie within its boundaries.

Much of the park is dedicated to the preservation and interpretation of the natural environment. The park has an 18-hole regulation golf course, an Environmental Discovery Center, an underwater pond viewing room, a splash-n-play park, a life-sized maze, a nature center, an 8-mile paved hike-bike trail, 12 miles of cross country ski trails, and picnic areas.

References

Huron–Clinton Metroparks
Protected areas of Oakland County, Michigan
Huron River (Michigan)